The Liberal Alternative ( or AL) was a French political party created on March 1, 2006. The party advocates for classical liberalism and libertarianism and against socialism and conservatism. Therefore their political colour is purple, between the red of the left-wing and the blue of the right-wing.

It advocates stronger powers given to the Parliament and a separation from the Prime Minister; favouring a presidential/congressional system as opposed to a strict parliamentary system. It emphasizes a more political, rather than economic, role in the European Union (EU) to promote civil liberties and liberalism as the basis of the EU Constitution.

Some members of Liberté chérie, a classical liberal association, took part in the creation of the Liberal Alternative, including Édouard Fillias, founder of Liberté Chérie, Aurélien Veron, former president and Sabine Herold, cofounder.

Popular support and electoral record
In the 2007 presidential election, Édouard Fillias, the founder and leader of AL, failed to obtain the necessary endorsements from at least 500 French elected officials. Liberal Alternative, with no candidate of its own, endorsed the centrist Union for French Democracy (UDF) candidate François Bayrou.

Liberal Alternative also fielded nearly 50 candidates for the 2007 legislative elections, it obtained between 0.09% and 1.49%.

European Parliament

Despite a recent split, AL ran five lists in the 2009 European Parliament election: in the Île-de-France, West, East, South East and South-West constituencies. Overall, the party won 0.10% in Île-de-France, 0.26% in the East, 0.13% in the South-West, 0.02% in the South-East, and 0.18% in the West.

References

External links 
 Liberal Alternative website (English pages)
 Commentary in the Wall Street Journal
 An Interview with Sabine Herold on Politics, France, and Freedom

Classical liberal parties
Libertarian parties
Libertarianism in France
Centrist parties in France
Political parties of the French Fifth Republic
Political parties established in 2006